Noble Wayne LaMaster (February 13, 1907 – August 4, 1989), was a professional baseball player who pitched in the Major Leagues for the Philadelphia Phillies and Brooklyn Dodgers during the 1937–1938 baseball seasons. He was purchased by the Dodgers on August 8, 1938.

Born in Speed, Indiana, LaMaster died in New Albany, Indiana, on August 4, 1989, aged 82.

References

External links

1907 births
1989 deaths
Major League Baseball pitchers
Baseball players from Indiana
Philadelphia Phillies players
Brooklyn Dodgers players
New Orleans Pelicans (baseball) players
Jackson Senators players
Selma Cloverleafs players
Decatur Commodores players
Terre Haute Tots players
Charleston Senators players
Montreal Royals players
Milwaukee Brewers (minor league) players
Louisville Colonels (minor league) players
Durham Bulls players